Jude Johnstone is an American singer-songwriter. Her songs have been covered by Laura Branigan, Trisha Yearwood, Emmylou Harris, Bonnie Raitt, Bette Midler, Johnny Cash, Stevie Nicks, Mary Black, and others. Johnstone wrote the No. 1 song "The Woman Before Me" on Yearwood's debut CD, which also won an award from Broadcast Music Incorporated. In 1997, Johnny Cash won the Country Album of the Year Grammy for American II: Unchained for which Johnstone wrote the title track. BoJak Records was created by her manager, Bob Burton, in 2002 to release her debut CD Coming of Age, followed by the 2005 release of On a Good Day, Blue Light in 2007, Mr. Sun in 2008, Quiet Girl in 2011, Shatter in 2013, A Woman's Work in 2016, and Living Room in 2019. She lives in Nashville, Tennessee.

Discography
Coming of Age (2002)
On a Good Day (2005)
Blue Light (2007)
Mr. Sun (2008)
Quiet Girl (2011)
Shatter (2013)
A Woman's Work (2016)
Living Room (2019)

Song credits
 Rebecca Newton – "Quiet Girl" – Blue Shirt (2019)
Neilson Hubbard – "My Heart Belongs to You" – Cumberland Island, 2018 (co-written with Neilson Hubbard and Ben Glover)
 Mary Black – "Wounded Heart" – By The Time It Gets Dark (30th Anniversary edition), 2017
 Bavarian Brass – "Hearts in Armor" – Jubiläum 20 Jahre, 2015
 Trisha Yearwood – "The Woman Before Me" – ICON 2, 2014
 Trisha Yearwood – "The Nightingale" and "When We Were Still in Love" – Ballads, 2013
 Stephen Bishop – "My Little Waterloo" – Romance in Rio, 2009, (iTunes bonus track)
 Emmylou Harris – "Hold On" – All I Intended To Be, 2008
 Bonnie Raitt – "Wounded Heart" – Silver Lining, 2006
 Johnny Cash – "Unchained" – The Legend of Johnny Cash, Vol. II, 2006
 Trisha Yearwood – "When We Were Still in Love" – Inside Out, 2001
 Jennifer Warnes – "The Nightingale" – The Well, 2001
 Bette Midler – "The Girl is on to You" – 3 For One, 2000
 Johnny Cash/Willie Nelson – "Unchained"–VH1 Storytellers, 1998
 Johnny Cash – "Unchained" – Unchained – 1997 Grammy Country Album of the Year
 Trisha Yearwood – "The Woman Before Me" – Songbook, 1997
 Trisha Yearwood – "The Nightingale" – The Song Remembers When, 1993
 Trisha Yearwood – "Hearts in Armor" – Hearts in Armor, 1992
 Trisha Yearwood – "The Woman Before Me" – Trisha Yearwood, 1990
 Bette Midler – "The Girl Is On To You" – Some People's Lives, 1990
 Stevie Nicks – "Cry Wolf" – The Other Side of the Mirror, 1989
 Laura Branigan – "Cry Wolf" – Touch, 1987
 Clarence Clemons – "I Cross the Line" – Hero, 1985
 Lifetime/ABC Television's Army Wives – "Wounded Heart”
 Lifetime/ABC Television's Army Wives – "The Nightingale”
 Lifetime/ABC Television's Army Wives – "In This House”
 Lifetime/ABC Television's Army Wives – "The Hereafter”
 Showtime Television's Nurse Jackie – "Mr. Sun”
 Fox Television's Lie To Me – "Unchained"

Awards
 1992 Radio & Records No. 1 Song "The Woman Before Me”
 1993 BMI Songwriters Award "The Woman Before Me”
 1997 Grammy Country Album of The Year – Johnny Cash – Unchained
 2008 winner of the 8th annual Independent Music Awards Vox Pop vote for best Film/TV song in a dramatic series "In This House.”
 2012 1st prize winner of the 10th annual IAMA for best Americana/Roots song "Quiet Girl."

References

External links
 Official Site
 Jude Johnstone at Facebook
 Jude's Videos on YouTube
 Jude's Song Doctor Services

Songwriters from Maine
American women pop singers
Living people
Year of birth missing (living people)
Place of birth missing (living people)
21st-century American pianists
21st-century American women pianists